Sir Edward George Warris Hulton (29 November 1906 – 8 October 1988) was a British magazine publisher and writer.

Early life
Hulton was born to Sir Edward Hulton, 1st Baronet, a newspaper publisher and racehorse owner originally from Manchester, and his second wife, music hall artist, actress and singer Millicent Warris, born Fanny Elizabeth Warriss or Wariss, also known by the stage name Millie Lindon. Educated at Harrow School, Hulton went up to Brasenose College, Oxford, in 1925 but left in December 1926 without a degree.

Business and politics
Hulton founded the Hulton Press in 1937, buying Farmers' Weekly. The Hulton Press went on to publish Leader Magazine, Lilliput and the Picture Post, as well as the children's comics Eagle, Girl, Robin, and Swift.

During World War II, Hulton was one of the members of the 1941 Committee, a group of British politicians, writers and other people of influence not generally involved with a political party but who came together in 1941 to press for more efficient production to enhance the war effort. Hulton helped fund the Home Guard training school at Osterley Park, organising a private supply of weapons from the United States. Though he had stood unsuccessfully as a Conservative candidate at Leek in 1929, his 1943 book The New Age supported a mixed welfare-state economy and he welcomed Attlee's 1945 government.

Hulton discontinued the Picture Post in 1957 and sold the Hulton Press to Odhams two years later. He was knighted for services to journalism in 1957.

Hulton photographic archive
The photographic archive of Picture Post became an important historical documentary resource. It was set up by Hulton as a semi-independent operation, officially incorporated as the Hulton Press Library in 1947. It was bought by the BBC in 1958 and incorporated into the Radio Times photo archive, which was then sold to Brian Deutsch in 1988. In 1996 the Hulton Picture Collection was bought for £8.6m by Getty Images, who has retained the Hulton Archive as a featured resource within its large holdings.

Publications

Personal life
Hulton was married twice, first to Kira Goudime-Levkovitsch in 1927, and then later in 1946 to Princess Nika Yourievitch. Together Yourievitch and Hulton had two sons and one daughter, named Edward Alexander Sergius Hulton, Cosmo Philip Paul Hulton and Elizabeth Frances Helen Hulton. The marriage between Yourievitch and Hulton was dissolved in 1966, though the two lived together again for the last nine years of Hulton's life before he died on 8 October 1988.

References

Further reading

External links

All the Best - Britain’s Picture Post Magazine, Best Mirror and Old Friend to Many, 1938-57 in online and paperback forms. -- Picture Post was likely the greatest achievement of the Sir Edward George Warris Hulton's publishing empire, including being Britain's most popular magazine during WWII. "All the Best" author David Joseph Marcou covers Sir Edward's role in the editorial fortunes of his magazine, from his signing up PP founding editor Stefan Lorant to his sacking of Lorant's successor, 10-year editor Sir Tom Hopkinson. Many experts conclude Hopkinson's dismissal marked the beginning of the end of Picture Post, though Marcou's history covers it more intricately than that.

1906 births
1988 deaths
People from Harrogate
People educated at Harrow School
Alumni of Brasenose College, Oxford
English publishers (people)
British magazine publishers (people)
British book publishers (people)
Knights Bachelor
Hulton family
20th-century English businesspeople
Common Wealth Party